Sonny Emory (born December 23, 1962) is an American singer, songwriter, drummer and percussionist. Emory is a former member of the band Earth, Wind & Fire. He has also worked with artists such as Bruce Hornsby, Steely Dan, Eric Clapton and the B-52's.

Early years
Sonny Emory is a native of Atlanta, Georgia who received his first drum set at the age of five. He attended Frederick Douglass High School. He graduated from Georgia State University with a bachelor's degree in Jazz and Classical Performance. After graduating, Emory began his career as a professional percussionist.

Professional career
At first Emory played the drums on guitarist Bruce Hampton's 1987 album Arkansas and then upon keyboardist Joe Sample's 1987 LP Roles. Emory also went on join the band Earth, Wind & Fire during 1987.

He later featured on saxophonist Brandon Fields 1988 album The Traveler. Emory then featured alongside  Eric Clapton and David Sanborn on the soundtrack of the 1989 feature film Lethal Weapon 2. As well Emory played the drums on The B-52's 1989 LP Cosmic Thing, Phyllis Hyman's 1991 album Prime of My Life, Peabo Bryson 1991 LP Can You Stop the Rain and Chic's 1992 album Chic-ism.

Emory also featured on George Howard's 1993 LP When Summer Comes, Bobby Lyle's 1994 album Rhythm Stories and Everette Harp's 1994 LP Common Ground. He also played percussion upon the Urban Knights 1997 album Urban Knights II and Lee Ritenour's 1998 studio LP This Is Love.

Sonny was a member of Bruce Hornsby's Noisemakers band from 2002 to 2018.

Teaching career
Emory currently lectures as an adjunct professor in Applied Percussion at Georgia State University.

References

External links

1962 births
Earth, Wind & Fire members
Living people
20th-century American drummers
American male drummers
American jazz drummers
African-American drummers
American rock drummers
Soul drummers
Rhythm and blues drummers
American session musicians